Kåre Martin Hansen (14 July 1913 – 26 April 1985) was a Norwegian politician for the Labour Party.

He was born in Hammerfest.

He was elected to the Norwegian Parliament from Troms in 1961, and was re-elected on one occasion. He had previously been a deputy representative from 1958–1961.

Hansen was mayor of Tromsøysund municipality from 1947 to 1961. He was later a member of Tromsø municipality council in the period 1971–1975.

References

1913 births
1985 deaths
People from Hammerfest
Labour Party (Norway) politicians
Members of the Storting
20th-century Norwegian politicians